The Jumeirah Archaeological Site is a site which dates back to the Abbasid period in the 9th century AD, in the district of Jumeirah in the city of Dubai, the United Arab Emirates. It was first excavated in 1969 with different ancient items including architectural and decorative findings, ranging from a mosque, caravanserai, and residential houses to glazed pottery jars and plateware, bronze coins, glass and stone artefacts. It is owned and managed by Dubai Culture & Arts Authority.

Overview 
Archaeological excavations at the site, which was discovered in 1969, demonstrate that the area was inhabited as far back as the Abbasid era, approximately in the 10th century CE. At this time, it appears to have been the coastal part of an Eastern Arabian subregion referred to as 'Tawam', which comprises the city of Al Ain in the Emirate of Abu Dhabi, and the adjacent Omani town of Al-Buraimi.

See also
 Archaeology of the United Arab Emirates
 Dubai Museum
 History of the United Arab Emirates
 List of Ancient Settlements in the UAE

References

External links
 Jumeirah Archaeological Site, Dubai Culture & Arts Authority
 Lonelyplanet website

Jumeirah, Dubai
History of Dubai
Archaeological sites in the United Arab Emirates